Elsa Fougt (15 or 25 December 1744 – 19 June 1826) was a Swedish printer and newspaper editor. She managed the Royal Printery between 1772 and 1811 (first as a coworker with her spouse, from 1782 alone as director), and was responsible for the country's official print. She was also and the publisher and chief editor of the newspaper Stockholms Weckoblad from 1774 to 1779. She was an important figure in the literary market in Sweden.

Life

Fougt was the daughter of the royal printer Peter Momma and the publisher Anna Margareta von Bragner. In 1762 she married the official Henric Fougt Sr.

When her parents died, both in 1772, Elsa and her spouse took over their businesses, of which the most important was the Royal Printery, which they managed together until the death of her spouse in 1782. As a widow, she managed the business herself and in her own name for nearly thirty years. Elsa Fougt published French, German and Swedish drama, and imported books from the Société typographique de Neuchâtel in Switzerland.

She was herself also editor for the paper Stockholms Weckoblad from 1774 to 1779.

She was a member of the order Amarenterorden, in which she gave memorial speeches of the salonist Anna Charlotta von Stapelmohr and one of the co-founders of the order, Beata Elisabeth Théel.

In 1811, she retired and was succeeded by her son Henric Fougt Jr. in May, 1811.  Henric Fougt Jr. laid down the business by the end of 1833. Norstedt & Söner acquired it in 1835. Henric Fougt Jr., like his parents, held the privilege to print all official publications in the Swedish Realm.

Prior to Henric Fougt Sr. and his wife Elsa Fougt and their son Henric Fougt Jr., the father of Elsa Fougt - Peter Momma - had held the same position;  they all were the official "Royal Printers" of the Swedish Realm.

See also
Catharina Ahlgren
Anna Hammar-Rosén

References 

 Anna-Maria Rimm, ”Elsa Fougt som Kungl. boktryckare”, Samlaren 2007
 Anna-Maria Rimm, ”Den kungliga boktryckaren, del 2”, Biblis 2005:31
 Anna-Maria Rimm, ”Den kungliga boktryckaren, del 1”, Biblis 2005:30
 Henric Fougt, urn:sbl:14410, Svenskt biografiskt lexikon (art av Bengt Hildebrand Hans Gillingstam), hämtad 2015-11-16.
 Berger, Margareta, Pennskaft: kvinnliga journalister i svensk dagspress 1690-1975 [Penholders: Female journalists in Swedish press 1690-1975], Norstedt, Stockholm, 1977

Further reading 
 

1744 births
1826 deaths
Swedish editors
Swedish women editors
18th-century Swedish businesspeople
Swedish newspaper publishers (people)
18th-century publishers (people)
Gustavian era people
Women printers
18th-century printers
18th-century newspaper publishers (people)
19th-century newspaper publishers (people)
18th-century translators
18th-century Swedish businesswomen
19th-century Swedish businesswomen
19th-century Swedish businesspeople